Anderson is an unincorporated community in Macoupin County, Illinois, United States.

Notes

Unincorporated communities in Macoupin County, Illinois
Unincorporated communities in Illinois